The  is a Japanese diesel-electric multiple unit (DEMU) train type introduced by Hokkaido Railway Company (JR Hokkaido) to replace the ageing KiHa 40 series DMU cars. The trains are nicknamed "DECMO", standing for "diesel electric car with motors". They commenced passenger operations in March 2020 on the Hakodate Main Line.

Design
Based on the GV-E400 series DMUs on order by JR East, the H100 series trains are the first diesel-electric multiple units to be operated by JR Hokkaido, with diesel engines driving generators, which in turn power electric traction motors. The trains have stainless steel bodies, and a maximum speed of 100 km/h (62 mph).

Interior
Passenger accommodation consists of longitudinal seating close to the doorways and 2+1 transverse seating further inside the cars. The cars have universal access toilets.

History
Details about the new trains were announced by JR Hokkaido on 12 July 2017. Two single-car pre-series units were delivered from the Kawasaki Heavy Industries factory in Kobe in February 2018 and underwent test-running and evaluation until March 2019. In September 2019, deliveries of the full-production units commenced and on 14 March 2020, passenger operations started with a total of 15 cars on the Hakodate Main Line between Oshamambe and Sapporo. In the fiscal years (April to March) 2020 and 2021, a total of 60 more cars are planned for construction.

From 18 March 2023, the H100 series cars are expected to be introduced on the Furano Line.

References

External links

 JR Hokkaido press release 

Diesel multiple units of Japan
Hokkaido Railway Company
Train-related introductions in 2020
Kawasaki multiple units